This was the first edition of the event.
João Sousa won the title, defeating Marius Copil 6–3, 6–0 in the final.

Seeds

Draw

Finals

Top half

Bottom half

References
 Main Draw
 Qualifying Draw

Guimaraes Open - Singles
2013 Singles
2013 in Portuguese tennis